Kirsty Anne Taylor (born 18 June 1971) is an English professional golfer who played on the Ladies European Tour. She competed as Kirsty Speak before she married Alistair Taylor in 1997.

Taylor learned her golf at Clitheroe Golf Club where her parents Ted and Jean Anne Speak and her brother were also members. As an amateur, she was English Intermediate Champion 1992 and 1993, runner-up at the 1993 British Ladies Amateur Championship, and British Strokeplay Champion in 1994. She represented Great Britain & Ireland at the Curtis Cup and Vagliano Trophy.

In 2000, Taylor finished runner-up at the LPGA Tour co-sanctioned Women's British Open and at the Mexx Sport Open. She set a course record and Ladies European Tour record low round of eleven-under-par 61 to win the 2005 Wales Ladies Championship of Europe. In addition, in 2007, she was runner-up at the Catalonia Ladies Masters, Ladies English Open, De Vere Ladies Scottish Open and the Nykredit Masters, where she lost a playoff to Lisa Hall.

In 2008 she was due to partner with Trish Johnson at the Women's World Cup of Golf, but Danielle Masters attended as her replacement as she was diagnosed with a brain tumour. Taylor battled back after surgery and radiotherapy, but called time on her professional career. She signed up as an Ambassador for Golf Roots, a UK project to introduce youngsters from all backgrounds and abilities to golf.

Professional wins (1)

Ladies European Tour wins (1)

Ladies European Tour playoff record (0–1)

Team appearances
Amateur
European Ladies' Team Championship (representing England): 1993
Vagliano Trophy (representing Great Britain & Ireland): 1993 (winners)
Curtis Cup (representing Great Britain & Ireland): 1994 (tie)
Espirito Santo Trophy (representing Great Britain & Ireland): 1994

References

External links

English female golfers
Ladies European Tour golfers
1971 births
Living people